Mesodica infuscata is a moth in the family Carposinidae. It is found on Java.

References

Natural History Museum Lepidoptera generic names catalog

Carposinidae